

Karl Rübel (16 August 1895 – 8 March 1945) was a German general during World War II. He was a recipient of the Knight's Cross of the Iron Cross of Nazi Germany. Rübel was killed on 8 March 1945 near Schivelbein, Pomerania, during the course of the Soviet East Pomeranian Offensive.

Awards and decorations 

 Knight's Cross of the Iron Cross on 13 January 1945 as Generalleutnant and commander of 163. Infanterie-Division

References

Citations

Bibliography

 

1895 births
1945 deaths
Lieutenant generals of the German Army (Wehrmacht)
Recipients of the Gold German Cross
Recipients of the Knight's Cross of the Iron Cross
German Army personnel killed in World War II
Recipients of the clasp to the Iron Cross, 1st class
Military personnel from Dortmund